Central Volcanic Mountain Range Forest Reserve, is a protected area in Costa Rica, managed under the Central Conservation Area, it was created in 1975 by decree 4961-A.

References 

Nature reserves in Costa Rica
Protected areas established in 1975
1975 establishments in Costa Rica
Forest reserves